is a Japanese footballer currently playing as a defender for FC Ryukyu.

Career statistics

Club
.

Notes

References

External links

1998 births
Living people
Sportspeople from Okinawa Prefecture
Association football people from Okinawa Prefecture
Josai International University alumni
Japanese footballers
Association football defenders
FC Ryukyu players
J2 League players